Catherine of Bologna [Caterina de' Vigri] (8 September 1413 – 9 March 1463) was an Italian Poor Clare, writer, teacher, mystic, artist, and saint. The patron saint of artists and against temptations, Catherine de' Vigri was venerated for nearly three centuries in her native Bologna before being formally canonized in 1712 by Pope Clement XI. Her feast day is 9 March.

Life
Catherine came from an upper-class family, the daughter of Benvenuta Mammolini of Bologna and Giovanni Vigri, a Ferrarese notary who worked for Niccolò III d'Este, Marquis of Ferrara. She was raised at Niccolo III's court as a lady-in-waiting to his wife Parisina Malatesta (d. 1425) and became lifelong friends with his natural daughter Margherita d'Este (d. 1478). During this time, she received some education in reading, writing, music, playing the viola, and had access to illuminated manuscripts in the d'Este Court library.

In 1426, after Niccolo III's execution of Parisina d'Este for infidelity, Catherine left court and joined a lay community of beguines living a semi-religious life and following the Augustinian rule. The women were divided over whether instead to adhere to the Franciscan rule, which eventually happened. In 1431 the beguine house was converted into the Observant Poor Clare convent of Corpus Domini, which grew from 12 women in 1431 to 144 women by the end of the century. Catherine lived at Corpus Domini, Ferrara most of her life from 1431 to 1456, serving as Mistress of Novices. She was a model of piety and reported experiencing miracles and several visions of Christ, the Virgin Mary, Thomas Becket, and Joseph, as well as future events, such as the fall of Constantinople in 1453. She wrote a number of religious treatises, lauds, sermons, and copied and illustrated her own breviary (see below).

In 1455 the Franciscans and the governors of Bologna requested that she become abbess of a new convent, which was to be established under the name of Corpus Domini in Bologna. She left Ferrara in July 1456 with 12 sisters to start the new community and remained abbess there until her death on 9 March 1463. Catherine was buried in the convent graveyard, but after eighteen days, a sweet smell emanated from the grave and the incorrupt body was exhumed. It was eventually relocated to a chapel where it remains on display, dressed in her religious habit, seated upright behind glass. A contemporary Poor Clare, Sister Illuminata Bembo, wrote her biography in 1469. A strong local Bolognese cult of Caterina Vigri developed and she became a Beata in the 1520s but was not canonized until 1712.

Literary works

Catherine's best-known text is Seven Spiritual Weapons Necessary for Spiritual Warfare which she appears to have first written in 1438 and then rewritten and augmented between 1450 and 1456. Although she probably taught similar ideas, she kept the written version hidden until she neared death and then handed it to her confessor with instructions to send a copy to the Poor Clares at Ferrara. Part of this book describes at length her visions both of God and of Satan. The treatise was circulated in manuscript form through a network of Poor Clare convents. The Sette Armi Spirituali became an important part of the campaign for her canonization. It was first printed in 1475, and went through 21 later editions in the sixteenth and seventeenth centuries, including being translated into Latin, French, Portuguese, English, Spanish, and German. It, therefore, played an important role in the dissemination of late medieval vernacular mysticism in the early modern period. In addition, she wrote lauds, short religious treatises, and letters, as well as a 5000-line Latin poem called the Rosarium Metricum, the I Dodici Giardini and I Sermoni. These were discovered around 2000 and described by Cardinal Giacomo Biffi: as "now revealed in their surprising beauty. We can ascertain that she was not undeserving of her renown as a highly cultivated person. We are now in a position to meditate on a veritable monument of theology which, after the Treatise on the Seven Spiritual Weapons, is made up of distinct and autonomous parts: The Twelve Gardens, a mystical work of her youth, Rosarium, a Latin poem on the life of Jesus, and The Sermons, copies of Catherine's words to her religious sisters."  Saint Catherine of Bologna had good education in drawing, writing, reading and language.

Artistic works

Catherine represents the rare phenomenon of a 15th-century nun–an artist whose artworks are preserved in her personal breviary. She meditated while she copied the scriptural text, adding about 1000 prayer rubrics, and drew initials with bust-portraits of saints, paying special attention to images of Clare and Francis. Besides multiple images of Christ and the infant swaddled Christ Child, she depicted other saints, including Thomas Becket, Jerome, Paul, Anthony of Padua, Mary Magdalene, and Catherine of Alexandria. Her self-taught style incorporated motifs from needlework and devotional prints. Some saints' images, interwoven with text and rubrics, display an idiosyncratic, inventive iconography also found in German nuns' artworks (nönnenarbeiten). The breviary and its images surely served a didactic function within the convent community. Other panel paintings and manuscripts attributed to her include the Madonna and Child (nicknamed the Madonna del Pomo) in the Cappella Della Santa, a possible portrait or self-portrait in the autograph copy of the Sette Armi Spirituali, a Redeemer, and another Madonna and Child in her chapel. Recently one scholar has tried to question certain attributions.

A drawing of a Man of Sorrows or Resurrected Christ found in a miscellany of lauds (Ms. 35 no.4, Archivio Generale Arcivescovile, Bologna) has also been attributed to her. Catherine is significant as a woman artist who articulated an aesthetic philosophy. She explained that although it took precious time, the purpose of her religious art was "to increase devotion for herself and others".

References

Sources

Further reading
 Babler, Ernst Z., Katharina (Vigri) von Bologna (1413–1463), Leben und Schriften, Fachstelle Franzikanishe Forschung, Munster, 2012 
 Bartoli, Marco. Caterina, la Santa di Bologna, Bologna: Ed. Dehone, 2003.
 Chadwick, Whitney. Women, Art and Society, London: Thames and Hudson, 1994 
 Evangelisti, Silvia. Nuns: a history of convent life, 1450–1700. Oxford University Press, 2007.
 Fortunati, Vera, Jordano Pomeroy & Claudio Strinati, Italian Women Artists from Renaissance to Baroque, National Museum of Women in the Arts, Washington, D. C., 2009.
 Guerro, P. Angel Rodriguez, Vita di Santa Caterina da Bologna. Bologna, 1996.
 Harris, Anne Sutherland and Linda Nochlin, Women Artists: 1550–1950, Los Angeles County Museum of Art, Knopf, New York, 1976 
 Morina, Giulio. Vita della Beata Caterina da Bologna. Descritta in pittura, Ed. Pazzini, 2002
 Pomata, Gianna. "Malpighi and the holy body: medical experts and miraculous evidence in seventeenth-century Italy", Renaissance Studies 21, no. 4 (2007): 568–586.
 Ricciardi, Renzo. Santa Caterina da Bologna, Ed. Tipografia del Commercio, Bologna 1979.
 Rubbi, Paola. Una Santa, una Città, Caterina Vigri, co-patrona di Bologna, Ed. del Galluzzo 2004.
 Spanò Martinelli, Serena. Il processo di canonizzazione di Caterina Vigri, 2003.
 Santa Caterina da Bologna. Dalla Corte Estense alla Corte Celeste, Bologna, Ed. Barghigiani, 2001.
 Caterina Vigri, la Santa e la Città, Atti del Convegno, Bologna, 13–15 November 2002, Ed. Galluzzo 2004.
 Caterina Vigri, The Seven Spiritual Weapons'', translated by Hugh Feiss & Daniela Re, Toronto, 1998.

External links

 Saint Catherine of Bologna Parish, Ringwood, New Jersey
 Sanctuary of Corpus Domini, Bologna, Italy

1413 births
1463 deaths
15th-century Christian saints
15th-century Italian women writers
15th-century women artists
Franciscan saints
Incorrupt saints
15th-century Italian Roman Catholic religious sisters and nuns
Medieval Italian saints
Italian women artists
Nobility from Bologna
Poor Clare abbesses
Female saints of medieval Italy
Christian female saints of the Middle Ages
Nuns and art
Artists from Bologna
Catholic painters
Female Catholic artists
Canonizations by Pope Clement XI